"The Lebanon" is a song by the British synthpop group the Human League, released as a single in April 1984. Written jointly by lead singer Philip Oakey and keyboard player and guitarist Jo Callis, it was the first single from the band's fourth album Hysteria. It was recorded at AIR Studios in 1983-84.

Background 
The song was conceived, written and recorded at a time when the band were under considerable pressure to provide Virgin Records with a follow up album to equal the enormous international success of Dare. The band was recording in the £1,000-per-day AIR Studios, where they remained for a full year, frequently arguing with each other.

The lyrics were a statement on the Lebanese civil war, which had been exacerbated by the Israeli invasion of southern Lebanon in 1982. In a television interview, band member Philip Adrian Wright commented that Oakey's lyrics were written specifically about the Sabra and Shatila massacre. Singer Susan Ann Sulley said that the band "wanted to speak up for the little people" and say something meaningful about the situation in Lebanon. The band were criticised as banal and "out of their depth," but in a retrospective review, AllMusic journalist Andy Kellman wrote that the song "looks atrocious on paper but sounds fantastic."

"The Lebanon" was released as a single in the UK in April 1984. It failed to replicate the success of the band's previous singles "(Keep Feeling) Fascination" and "Mirror Man", only reaching #11 on the UK Singles chart and #64 on the Billboard Hot 100, becoming the band's lowest-charting single in the U.S. The track is frequently played by the band live.

Promotional video
The music video for the song was filmed in the Theatre Royal, London in March 1984. The video appears to be filmed at a Human League concert with the band playing live on stage, but the concert was staged and the band mimed to the music. The audience were invited extras and dancers placed in the front of the stage.

Critical reception
Upon its release, Andy Strike of Record Mirror described the song as "a grower" and added that it is "heavier than the League's last couple of singles". He commented, "Jo Callis rediscovers his guitar and adds a U2/Public Image Ltd riff to the normal synth and deep throat backing."

Track listing
 7-inch vinyl (Virgin VS 672)
 "The Lebanon" – 3:45
 "Thirteen" – 4:10

 12-inch vinyl (Virgin VS 672-12)
 "The Lebanon" – 5:52
 "Thirteen" – 5:00
 "The Lebanon (Instrumental)" – 5:07

References

1984 singles
Anti-war songs
Songs about Lebanon
The Human League songs
Song recordings produced by Chris Thomas (record producer)
Song recordings produced by Hugh Padgham
Songs written by Jo Callis
Songs written by Philip Oakey
1984 songs
Virgin Records singles